Victor of Aveyron was a French feral child who was found at the age of around 9. Not only is he considered the most famous feral child, but his case is also the most documented case of a feral child. Upon his discovery, he was captured multiple times, running away from civilization approximately eight times. Eventually his case was taken up by a young physician, Jean Marc Gaspard Itard, who worked with the boy for five years and gave him his name, Victor. Itard was interested in determining what Victor could learn. He devised procedures to teach the boy words and recorded his progress. Based on his work with Victor, Itard broke new ground in the education of the developmentally delayed.

Early life
Victor was prepubescent when he was captured in 1800, but experienced puberty within a year or two. It is not known when or how he came to live in the woods near Saint-Sernin-sur-Rance, though he was reportedly seen there around 1794. In 1797 he was spotted by three hunters; he ran from them but they were able to catch him when he tried to climb a tree. They brought him to a nearby town where he was cared for by a widow. However, he soon escaped and returned to the woods; he was periodically spotted in 1798 and 1799. On 8 January 1800, he emerged from the forests on his own. His age was unknown, but citizens of the village estimated his age to be about 12. His lack of speech, as well as his food preferences and the numerous scars on his body, suggested to some that he had been in the wild for most of his life.

Discovery
In 1797, a child of around nine or ten years of age was sighted in the Tarn. Two years later, he was caught by some men and dogs, escorted to the village of Lacaune and taken in by a widow. He ate nothing except for raw vegetables or vegetables he cooked himself. He ran away after a week.

In the winter of 1799, he went from Tarn to Aveyron. On the 6 or the 8 of January 1800 he was spotted naked, stooped and with tousled hair by three shoemakers, who took him out of the woods. He ran away, left the woods and was discovered a week later at a dyer's house in Saint-Sernin-sur-Rance. He did not speak and his movements were chaotic. According to the philosopher François Dagognet, 'he walks on four legs, eats plants, is hairy, deaf and mute.' He was sent to an orphanage at Saint-Affrique three days later, then to another at Rodez on the 4 February. The psychiatrist Philippe Pinel, doctor at the Bicêtre Hospital, wrote a report on Victor and considered him to be mentally ill and an idiot from birth.

Study

Shortly after Victor was found, a local abbot and biology professor, Pierre Joseph Bonnaterre, examined him. He removed the boy's clothing and led him outside into the snow, where, far from being upset, Victor began to frolic about in the nude, showing Bonnaterre that he was clearly accustomed to exposure and cold. The local government commissioner, Constans-Saint-Esteve, also observed the boy and wrote there was "something extraordinary in his behavior, which makes him seem close to the state of wild animals". The boy was eventually taken to Rodez, where two men traveled each seeking to discover whether or not he was their missing son. Both men had lost their sons during the French Revolution, but neither claimed the boy as his son. There were other rumors regarding the boy's origins. For example, one rumor insisted the boy was the illegitimate son of a notaire abandoned at a young age because he was mute. Itard believed Victor had "lived in an absolute solitude from his fourth or fifth almost to his twelfth year, which is the age he may have been when he was taken in the Caune woods." That means he presumably lived for seven years in the wilderness.

It was clear that Victor could hear, but he was taken to the National Institute of the Deaf in Paris for the purpose of being studied by the renowned Roch-Ambroise Cucurron Sicard. Sicard and other members of the Society of Observers of Man believed that by studying, as well as educating the boy, they would gain the proof they needed for the recently popularized empiricist theory of knowledge. In the context of the Enlightenment, when many were debating what exactly distinguished human from animal, one of the most significant factors was the ability to learn language. By studying the boy, they would also be able to explain the relationship between humans and society.

Influence of the Enlightenment
The Enlightenment caused many thinkers, including naturalists and philosophers, to believe human nature was a subject that needed to be redefined and looked at from a completely different angle. Because of the French Revolution and new developments in science and philosophy, humans were looked at not as special but as characteristic of their place in nature. It was hoped that by studying the wild boy, this idea would gain support. As such, Victor became a case study in the Enlightenment debate about the differences between humans and other animals.

At that time, the scientific category Juvenis averionensis was used, as a special case of the Homo ferus, described by Carl Linnaeus in Systema Naturae. Linnaeus and his discoveries, then, forced people to ask the question, "What makes us [human]?" Another developing idea prevalent during the Enlightenment was that of the noble savage. Some believed a person existing in the pure state of nature would be "gentle, innocent, a lover of solitude, ignorant of evil and incapable of causing intentional harm."

Philosophies proposed by Rousseau, Locke and Descartes were evolving around the time the boy was discovered in France in 1800. These philosophies invariably influenced the way the boy was perceived by others, and eventually, how Itard would structure his education.

Education and later life
It was said that even though he had been exposed to society and education, he had made little progress at the institution under Sicard. Many people questioned his ability to learn because of his initial state, and as Yousef explains, "it is one thing to say that the [person] of nature is not yet fully human; it is quite another thing to say that the [person] of nature cannot become fully human." After Sicard became frustrated with the lack of progress made by the boy, he was left to roam the institution by himself, until Itard decided to take the boy into his home to keep reports and monitor his development.

Jean Marc Gaspard Itard
Jean Marc Gaspard Itard, a young medical student, effectively adopted Victor into his home and published reports on his progress. Itard believed two things separated humans from animals: empathy and language. He wanted to civilize Victor with the objectives of teaching him to speak and to communicate human emotion. Victor showed significant early progress in understanding language and reading simple words, but failed to progress beyond a rudimentary level. Itard wrote, "Under these circumstances his ear was not an organ for the appreciation of sounds, their articulations and their combinations; it was nothing but a simple means of self-preservation which warned of the approach of a dangerous animal or the fall of wild fruit."

The only two phrases Victor ever actually learned to spell out were lait ('milk') and Oh, Dieu ('Oh, God'). It would seem, however, that Itard implemented more contemporary views when he was educating Victor. Rousseau appears to have believed "that natural association is based on reciprocally free and equal respect between people." This notion of how to educate and to teach was something that although it did not produce the effects hoped for, did prove to be a step towards new systems of pedagogy. By attempting to learn about the boy who lived in nature, education could be restructured and characterized.

Itard has been recognized as the founder of "oral education of the deaf; the field of otolaryngology; the use of behavior modification with severely impaired children; and special education for the mentally and physically handicapped."

While Victor did not learn to speak the language that Itard tried to teach him, it seems that Victor did make progress in his behavior towards other people. At the Itard home, housekeeper Madame Guérin was setting the table one evening while crying over the loss of her husband. Victor stopped what he was doing and displayed consoling behavior towards her. Itard reported on this progress.

Language
When looking at the association between language and intellect, French society considered one with the other. Unless cared for by friends or family, the mute routinely ended up in horrible, ghastly conditions. However, around 1750, something different was happening in Paris. A French priest, Charles-Michel de l'Épée, created a school to educate the deaf and mute. His institution was made into a National Institute in 1790. This new interest and moral obligation towards the deaf and mute inspired Itard to nurture and attempt to teach Victor language. "He had Locke's and Condillac's theory that we are born with empty heads and that our ideas arise from what we perceive and experience. Having experienced almost nothing of society, the boy remained a savage."

Throughout the years Itard spent working with Victor, he made some gradual progress. Victor understood the meaning of actions and used what 20th-century writer Roger Shattuck describes as "action language", which Itard regarded as a kind of primitive form of communication. However, Itard still could not get Victor to speak. He wondered why Victor would choose to remain silent when he had already proved that he was not, in fact, deaf. Victor also did not understand tones of voice. Itard proclaimed "Victor was the mental and psychological equivalent of someone born deaf-and-dumb. There would be little point in trying to teach him to speak by the normal means of repeating sounds if he didn't really hear them."

Shattuck critiques Itard's process of education, wondering why he never attempted to teach Victor to use sign language. Regardless, today there are certain hypotheses that Shattuck applies to Victor. "One is that the Wild Boy, though born normal, developed a serious mental or psychological disturbance before his abandonment. Precocious schizophrenia, infantile psychosis, autism; a number of technical terms have been applied to his position. Several psychiatrists I have consulted favor this approach. It provides both a motivation for abandonment and an explanation for his partial recovery under Itard's treatment."

Victor died of pneumonia in Paris in 1828 in the home of Madame Guérin.

Recent commentary
Professor Uta Frith has stated she believes Victor displayed signs of autism. Serge Aroles, in his book L'énigme des enfants-loups (The Mystery of the Wolf-Children), also believes that surviving accounts of his behavior point to "a moderate degree of autism" (autisme moderé) in Victor's case. Aroles notes that Victor showed characteristic signs of mental derangement, like grinding of the teeth, incessant rocking back and forth, and sudden, spasmodic movements.

In March 2008, following the disclosure that Misha Defonseca's best-selling book, later turned into film Survivre avec les loups ('Survival with the Wolves') was a hoax, there was a debate in the French media (newspapers, radio and television) concerning the numerous false cases of feral children uncritically believed. Although there are numerous books on this subject, almost none of them have been based on archives, the authors using rather dubious second- or third-hand, printed information. According to French surgeon Serge Aroles, author of a general study of the phenomenon of feral children based on archives, almost all of these cases are fakes. In his judgment, Victor of Aveyron was not a genuine feral child; in Aroles' view, the scars on his body were not the consequences of a wild life in the forests, but rather of physical abuse at the hands of his parents or whoever initially raised him. Humans need to be nurtured at least until the age of 5 or 6; it is inconceivable that any child, including Victor, could survive on his own, in the wild, younger than that. This disability could also explain why he was abused, perhaps treated like an animal, in his earliest years. Bettelheim, 1959 makes a case for this being a general pattern in the lives of so-called feral children.

Dramatizations and fictionalizations

Victor's life has been dramatized or fictionalized in a number of works:
 François Truffaut's 1970 film L'Enfant sauvage (marketed in the UK as The Wild Boy and in the US as The Wild Child) performed by Jean-Pierre Cargol. This film helped inspire the 2012 album L'Enfant Sauvage by French metal band Gojira.
 Adrienne Rich's poem "Meditations for a Savage Child," published in her 1973 collection Diving into the Wreck, is addressed to Victor.
 a fourth-season episode of In Search Of..., titled "Wild Children", in 1980.
 the 2003 novel Wild Boy by Jill Dawson.
 the title novella of the 2010 collection Wild Child and Other Stories by T. C. Boyle.
 Mordicai Gerstein's novel Victor: A Novel Based in the Life of the Savage of Aveyron.
 "Victor", a song by the band Maison Neuve released on Sauvage Records 
 Mary Losure's non-fiction children's book Wild Boy: The Real Life of the Savage of Aveyron.
 Stephen Fry's Planet Word: depicting whether language is developed within a social context.

References

Further reading

External links
 , originally broadcast 18 Oct. 1994, contains a segment about Victor

1780s births
1828 deaths
Feral children
French children
Year of birth uncertain
Deaths from pneumonia in France